Paulo Oppliger (born 16 November 1971) is a Chilean former alpine skier who competed with Chilean license in the 1988 Winter Olympics and 1992 Winter Olympics.

External links
 sports-reference.com
 

1971 births
Living people
Chilean male alpine skiers
Olympic alpine skiers of Chile
Alpine skiers at the 1988 Winter Olympics
Alpine skiers at the 1992 Winter Olympics
Place of birth missing (living people)
20th-century Chilean people